Men's long distance cross-country classic skiing events at the 2006 Winter Paralympics were contested at Pragelato on 18–19 March.

There were 3 events, of 20 km or 15 km distance. Standings were decided by applying a disability factor to the actual times achieved.

Results

20km Visually impaired
The visually impaired event took place on 19 March. It was won by Oleh Munts, representing .

15km Sitting
The sitting event took place on 18 March. It was won by Iurii Kostiuk, representing .

20km Standing
The standing event took place on 19 March. It was won by Kirill Mikhaylov, representing .

References

M